Žarko M. Tatić (18941931) was a renowned Serbian-Yugoslavian architect and art historian active in the first decades of the 20th century. His field of research was the history of Medieval Serbian architecture in the country and beyond (Mount Athos).

He was among the first Serbian art historians to make research on Mount Athos. He stayed there in 1923, when he made a detailed study of its medieval architecture. In the same year, the Serbian Academy of Arts and Sciences decided to send an expedition to Mount Athos and Hilandar monastery, to study its architecture. Tatić's results were first published in the newspaper Politika under the title Letter from the Holy Mountain, and subsequently included in his very popular and widely read book Tragom velike prošlosti (In Search of the Glorious Past) printed in belgrade in 1929.

Bibliography (partial)
 Tragom velike prošlosti (Belgrade, 1929)
 L'art byzantin chez les Slaves: les Balkans (1930)
 L'encien église de cimetière à Smederevo
 Markov Manastir

References 

Serbian architects
Serbian art historians
1894 births
1931 deaths